Ood or OOD may refer to:
 Ood, a fictional alien species from Doctor Who
 Ood, the name of a prophet in The Gods of Pegāna by Lord Dunsany
 ood, ISO 639-3 code for the Oʼodham language
 Officer of the day, at military installations
 Officer of the deck, in the US Navy and Coast Guard
 Object-oriented design, in software

See also
 Oodes, a genus of beetles
 Oud (disambiguation)